"Don't Love You No More (I'm Sorry)" is a song by British singer Craig David. It was written by David and Mark Hill for his third album The Story Goes... (2005). "Don't Love You No More (I'm Sorry)" gave David his second top ten hit from The Story Goes... and one of his biggest hits to date, tying with number-one single "7 Days" for longest-running single in the UK top 75, spending fifteen weeks on the chart. However, "Don't Love You No More (I'm Sorry)" is his biggest for most consecutive weeks inside the top 75 as "7 Days" had fourteen, before it re-entered for a week. The song was his biggest hit from The Story Goes, peaking at number 4, one place lower than "All the Way", which only spent six weeks inside the top 75.

Chart performance
"Don't Love You No More (I'm Sorry)" charted at number four on the UK Singles Chart, supplying him with his longest-running single since "7 Days", spending almost four months inside the UK top 75. In France, "Don't Love You No More (I'm Sorry)" missed the top 40.

Music video
There are two versions of the "Don't Love You No More (I'm Sorry)" video, a black-and-white version, which was first serviced to TV channels and a colour version, which was released later. The video was directed by Robert Hales.

Track listing
All tracks written by Craig David and Mark Hill.

Notes
  signifies an additional producer

Charts

Release history

References

2005 singles
Craig David songs
Songs written by Craig David
Songs written by Mark Hill (musician)
Warner Records singles